Interstate 535 (I-535) is a  auxiliary Interstate Highway spur route of I-35 in the US states of Minnesota and Wisconsin. It is paired with U.S. Highway 53 (US 53) along its entire route. The Interstate was part of the original 1956 Interstate Highway System and was completed in 1971. Since then, weight limits have been added to the Blatnik Bridge that carries the highway over Saint Louis Bay between Superior, Wisconsin, and Duluth, Minnesota.

Route description
I-535 begins in the city of Superior, Wisconsin, at the junction of US 53 and State Trunk Highway 35 (WIS 35) and continues northwest across the Blatnik Bridge over the Saint Louis Bay of Lake Superior. The freeway crosses from Wisconsin into Minnesota on the bridge and then meets an interchange for Garfield Avenue and the Port Terminal in the city of Duluth. I-535 ends at the junction of US 53 and I-35, known locally as the "Can of Worms" interchange, which features a pair of left exits from I-35, a stoplight, and lane drops over the I-35 bridge.

I-535 is the shortest Interstate in both Minnesota and Wisconsin. It also is the only Interstate in the two states with no exit numbers. I-535 in Wisconsin is one of the few instances in the United States of a three-digit Interstate Highway entering a state that its parent two-digit Interstate does not enter. Other examples include I-275 near Cincinnati, Ohio; I-287; and I-129.

In 2007, the Wisconsin Department of Transportation (WisDOT) surveys measured a traffic along their segment of I-535 at 21,800–29,500 vehicles daily, on average. The Minnesota Department of Transportation (MnDOT) measured 29,500 vehicles daily in their 2009 survey. As an Interstate Highway, I-535 is a part of the National Highway System, a network of roads important to the country's economy, defense, and mobility. I-535 is part of the Falls-to-Falls Corridor, a federally recognized trade corridor spanning from Eau Claire–Chippewa Falls, Wisconsin, to International Falls, Minnesota–Fort Frances, Ontario.

History
I-535 was authorized in 1957 as part of the original Interstate Highway System. The Blatnik Bridge was opened in 1961, and the ramps to I-35 were completed in 1971. I-535 and the Blatnik Bridge replaced a swinging toll bridge at generally the same location. That bridge existed from 1897 to 1962 and carried US 53 from Connor's Point in Superior to Garfield Avenue in Duluth.

In November 2011, both MnDOT and WisDOT installed new signs to remind drivers that trucks over  gross vehicle weight cannot use the Blatnik Bridge; these vehicles will be rerouted to the nearby Bong Bridge. According to the press release, permitted, overweight vehicles have been restricted from using the Blatnik Bridge since early 2008 when inspections showed that corrosion and time were starting to affect the structure. Transportation officials say that the bridge is aging, and restriction of overweight vehicles will help to extend the life of the bridge. Drivers who disregard the posted weight limits will be ticketed.

Exit list

See also

Notes

References

External links

I-535 at Wisconsin Highways
I-535 at The Unofficial Minnesota Highways Page

35-5
35-5
35-5
5
Transportation in Duluth, Minnesota
U.S. Route 53
Transportation in St. Louis County, Minnesota
Transportation in Douglas County, Wisconsin